Actinopus puelche is a species of mygalomorph spiders in the family Actinopodidae. It is found in Argentina and Uruguay.

References

puelche
Spiders described in 2018